Hugglescote and Donington le Heath is a civil parish in North West Leicestershire, England. The population of the civil parish at the 2011 census was 4,446.

The council consists of nine elected councillors who serve the whole parish.

At its annual meeting, held in May each year, the council appoints a chairman and vice-chairman. The current chairman is Councillor Russell Johnson (Labour) and the current vice-chairman is Councillor Clark Robinson
.

Clockwise, from the north, it borders the unparished area of Coalville and the parishes of Ellistown and Battleflat, Ravenstone with Snibston and Ibstock.

History
Both villages were part of the parish of Ibstock until 1878, when they were formed into a separate civil parish. In 1936 the parish was absorbed by the then urban district of Coalville. The civil parish of Hugglescote and Donington le Heath was reinstated by an order made in May 2010, and the new parish council held its inaugural meeting in May 2011.

Current composition

Election history
Elections to the council take place every four years at the same time as other local government elections in England. The council's inaugural election was held on 5 May 2011 and resulted in nine councillors being elected from a field of twelve candidates.

2011 election

2015 Election
In 2015 the Parish was warded, Hugglescote St Mary's and Hugglescote St John's respectively. At the close of nominations only 6 councillors had come forward, thankfully at the first meeting of the new cycle 2 new members were co-opted meaning the council was almost back to full strength.

References

External links

 Parish Council Website 

Civil parishes in Leicestershire
North West Leicestershire District